Kentucky Route 44 (KY 44) is a 70.193 mile (112.965 km) long state highway in the U.S. state of Kentucky managed and maintained by the Kentucky Transportation Cabinet.

KY 44 originates at a junction with U.S. Route 31W and U.S. Route 60 northeast of West Point. The Highway continues into Bullitt County and passes through the towns of Shepherdsville and Mt. Washington.  In Shepherdsville, KY 44 is an exit along I-65 (Exit 117).  From there, it enters Spencer County and passes through Taylorsville, Kentucky before briefly continuing into Shelby County and then passing into Anderson County.

KY 44 terminates at a junction with U.S. Route 62 and U.S. Route 127 in Lawrenceburg.

Route description

Jefferson County
KY 44 originates at a junction with U.S. Route 31W and U.S. Route 60 (known as Dixie Highway) as a two-lane undivided highway northeast of West Point in far southwestern Jefferson County at the banks of the Ohio River. From its western terminus, KY 44 heads eastward for  passing a mobile home park and crossing over Pond Creek in some woods before entering into Bullitt County.

Bullitt County
Once in Bullitt County, KY 44 becomes Shepherdsville Road and passes a couple of houses and a mobile home park before crossing over a railroad. At Hilltop Road, KY 44 curves toward the south, then back toward the north, before heading east again. Roughly  from the Jefferson County line, KY 44 enters the city of Shepherdsville, where it becomes West Fourth Street. The route intersects with KY 61(Buckman Street/Preston Highway) in Shepherdsville, a route running north into downtown Louisville. Interstate 65 also runs north into downtown Louisville, or south to Bowling Green and Nashville.

East of I-65, KY 44 becomes Mt. Washington Road as it continues eastward out of Shepherdsville and passes through a residential area with many homes and subdivisions lining the route. A few miles east of Shepherdsville, KY 44 enters the city of Mount Washington. In Mount Washington, KY 44 intersects with US 31E/US 150, also known as Bardstown Road. Bardstown Road runs northeast into downtown Louisville and all the way south to the Tennessee state line.

Spencer County
Once KY 44 enters Spencer County, it crosses over Dutchman Creek  from the Bullitt County line. East of Dutchman Creek, the road curves southeast, passing through Waterford.

In Taylorsville, KY 44 becomes West Main Street until it overlaps with KY 55, where it becomes East Main Street. Less than one mile from the western end of the KY 55 overlap, KY 44 turns north out of downtown Taylorsville and crosses over Brashears Creek. It then passes Spencer County High School and meets the western end of the KY 55 overlap where it turns east out of Taylorsville and becomes a 4-lane divided highway known as Little Mount Road. The highway curves northeast a few miles east of Taylorsville, passing north of Taylorsville Lake. It turns north toward Shelby County and narrows to two lanes.  north of KY 248, KY 44 enters Shelby County.

Shelby County
In Shelby County, the road becomes Southville Pike and curves northeast passing by occasional houses and open fields. KY 44 meets the southern terminus of KY 148  from the Spencer County line and continues for  longer where it meets KY 53 and KY 714 in Southville. The route then becomes concurrent with KY 53 (Mount Eden Road) as it turns toward the southeast. Roughly  from Southville, KY 44 enters Mount Eden and travels along the Shelby-Spencer County line for a short distance. Roughly  down the road, the route crosses over into Anderson County.

Anderson County
In Anderson County, the road travels toward the south, then curves toward the southeast, and then toward the east.  from the Spencer County line, the route meets the eastern end of the KY 53 overlap in Glensboro, where it becomes Glensboro Road. It continues eastward, passing through Anderson City and meeting the southern terminus of KY 395 east of Anderson City. KY 44 enters the city of Lawrenceburg where it intersects with US 62 Truck/US 127 Bypass, also known as the Lawrenceburg Bypass or Bypass North. The route ends at its eastern terminus at an intersection with US 127 and US 62  further east.

History

Sections of Route 44 in Bullitt County follows the Wilderness Road, a historic wagon road established in the early 19th century.

Major intersections

See also
Roads in Louisville, Kentucky

References

External links
 
 
 
 
 
KentuckyRoads.com KY 44

0044
0044
0044
0044
0044
0044
Transportation in Jefferson County, Kentucky